Andrew John Burch (born ) was an English cricketer. He was a right-handed batsman and wicket-keeper who played for Suffolk. He was born in Ipswich.

Burch, who played club cricket for Easton, Achilles, and Copdock and Old Ipswichian Cricket Club, made a single List A appearance for Suffolk during the 2001 C&G trophy, against Essex Cricket Board. He failed to score a run in the match.

External links
Andrew Burch at Cricket Archive 

1963 births
Living people
English cricketers
Suffolk cricketers
Cricketers from Ipswich